Willie Louis Greene (born September 23, 1971) is an American former professional baseball player in Major League Baseball (MLB). During his nine-year stint in the major leagues, Greene played for four teams: the Cincinnati Reds (1992–1998), the Baltimore Orioles (1998), Toronto Blue Jays (1999), and the Chicago Cubs (2000).

Minor leagues

Greene was the Pittsburgh Pirates' first pick in the 1989 June draft, and was also Georgia's Gatorade Player of The Year in baseball (1989). He was traded to the Montreal Expos on August 8 of 1990 with Scott Ruskin and Moisés Alou for Zane Smith. On December 11, 1991 Green was traded by the Montreal Expos with Dave Martinez and Scott Ruskin to the Cincinnati Reds for Bill Risley and John Wetteland.

Cincinnati Reds

From 1992 until 1995 Greene appeared on a sporadic basis with the Cincinnati Reds, before playing full-time beginning in 1996, appearing in 115 games that year.  In 1997, he appeared in 151 games and 111 in 1998 before being traded to the Baltimore Orioles for Jeffrey Hammonds. Greene's best full season by WAR for the Reds was 1997, when he had a batting average of .253 with 26 home runs for a WAR of 1.5.

References

External links

1971 births
Living people
American expatriate baseball players in Canada
Augusta Pirates players
Baltimore Orioles players
Baseball players from Georgia (U.S. state)
Cedar Rapids Reds players
Chattanooga Lookouts players
Chicago Cubs players
Cincinnati Reds players
Gulf Coast Pirates players
Indianapolis Indians players
Iowa Cubs players
Major League Baseball third basemen
People from Milledgeville, Georgia
Princeton Pirates players
Rockford Expos players
Salem Buccaneers players
Syracuse SkyChiefs players
Toronto Blue Jays players
West Palm Beach Expos players